Buzzle Bee is a studio album by English musical project The High Llamas. It was released in 2000 on Duophonic.

Critical reception
Exclaim! wrote: "Buzzle Bee proves that the Llamas have established a signature sound and much of it is faultlessly beautiful. There's a sense, though, that it's also an apex; if their music isn't to become as comfortable as all those Beach Boys comparisons are tiresome, some genuine surprises will need to occur next time." NME wrote that "'The Passing Bell' is brilliant Capri-Sun pop – and O’Hagan knows it, because he lets it meander on beautifully for ten minutes. After that, we’re at the mercy of his wayward desire to say nothing of any consequence in the style of Holland-era Brian Wilson with sunstroke."

Track listing 
All songs written by Sean O'Hagan.
 "The Passing Bell" – 6:31
 "Pat Mingus" – 4:25
 "Get Into the Galley Shop" – 4:38
 "Switch Pavilion" – 4:28
 "Tambourine Day" – 3:36
 "Sleeping Spray" – 5:05
 "New Broadway" – 5:11
 "Bobby's Court" – 5:55

Some editions of the album include the song "2 Part Byke" (6:04).

Liner Notes 

"The High Llamas are Rob Allum, Jon Fell, Marcus Holdaway, Sean O'Hagan.

All music played and arranged by The High Llamas with Dominic Murcott on vibes and marimba, Pete Aves on 12-string guitar and John Bennet on slide guitar.

John Teffer played tenor sax and flute and Andy Ramsay played modular synth.  Fulton Dingley is heard on electronic bits and pieces.  Mary Hansen and Susan James sang backing vocals on Get Into The Gallery Shop and Tambourine Day.  Mary sings on Switch Pavilion and Tambourine Day.  The chorus on The Passing Bell is Emma Carter, Kelsey Michael, Jo Haynes, Mary Hansen and Susan James.

The record was recorded by Fulton Dingley and mixed by Fulton Dingley and The High Llamas except Bobby's Court which was recorded by Dominic Murcott and mixed by Dominic and Sean.

Recorded and mixed at Blackwing Studios London except Bobby's Court which was recorded at Pinny Sound.

Thank you Eric.  Cover design M2.  Songs written by Sean O'Hagan and arranged by The High Llamas."

References 

2000 albums
The High Llamas albums